Mr Ya Miss ( Mr or Miss) is a 2005 Indian Hindi-language body swap, comedy film written and directed by Antara Mali. Also starring herself along with Ritesh Deshmukh, Aftab Shivdasani and Divya Dutta.

Plot
A womaniser is accidentally killed by one of his many girlfriends. He then finds himself reincarnated as a woman. This is not a second chance but punishment for his behaviour in his past life. He has several problems as the things he used to do with other girls like flirting, are being done to him.

Slowly whilst leading a girl's life he understands the error of his ways.

He starts to understand what girls feel and later when he realises it was a dream, he starts respecting them.

Production
Along with directing the film, Antara Mali also wrote script for it. The film is loosely inspired by 1991 American film Switch.

Cast
Antara Mali as Sanjana Patel
Aftab Shivdasani as Sanjay Patel
Riteish Deshmukh (credited as Ritiesh Deshmukh) as Shekhar Jaiswal
Divya Dutta as Loveleen Kapoor
Bharat Dabholkar as Prakash Malhotra
Ishrat Ali as Arvind Sen: Sanjay's Boss
Rushad Rana as Ravi Prasad
Dinesh Lamba as Tiwari Shankar
Anangsha as Rita Kasliwal
Kainaaz Pervees as Seema Das
Faezeh Jalali as Suzy Bahl

Soundtrack

The soundtrack album consists of four tracks written (lyrics and composition) by Nitin Raikwar while Kanha Kanha song's lyrics are written by Satchit Puranik (also director of the film) and composed by Ronkini Sharma and Zoeb Khan.

References

2000s Hindi-language films
Films about reincarnation
Films scored by Amar Mohile